The Woman of Bronze is a 1923 American silent drama film directed by King Vidor and distributed through Metro Pictures. It is based on a 1920 Broadway play by Henry Kistemaeckers (adapted by Paul Kester) which starred Margaret Anglin, John Halliday, and Mary Fowler. The film version is considered to be lost.

Plot
Vivian (Clara Kimball Young), a long-suffering wife, endures her artist husband’s infidelity with Sylvia (Kathryn McGuire), his young model. Leonard (Lloyd Whitlock) redeems himself when he recognizes the spiritual character of his wife. Vidor considered the film “out of my line.”

Cast
 Clara Kimball Young as Vivian Hunt
 John Bowers as Paddy Miles
 Kathryn McGuire as Sylvia Morton
 Edwin Stevens as Reggie Morton
 Lloyd Whitlock as Leonard Hunt
 Edward Kimball as Papa Bonelli

Production
During the filming of A Woman of Bronze Vidor was invited to join Samuel Goldwyn Productions, with whom he would make two pictures: Three Wise Fools (1923) and Wild Oranges (1924).

Reception
“A heavy emotional drama” as reported by Moving Picture World, 14 April 1923)

Footnotes

References
Durgnat, Raymond and Simmon, Scott. 1988. King Vidor, American. University of California Press, Berkeley.

External links

Stills at silenthollywood.com
Stills at silentfilmstillarchive.com
Film still at stanford.edu
Lobby card at impawards.com

1923 films
1923 drama films
1923 lost films
Silent American drama films
American silent feature films
American black-and-white films
American films based on plays
Films directed by King Vidor
Lost American films
Metro Pictures films
Lost drama films
1920s American films